Fritz Walden, real name Friedrich Drobilitsch, also Fritz Drobilitsch-Walden and Franz Drobilitsch, (3 January 1914 – 12 September 1992) was an Austrian publicist, author and cultural editor as well as film, literature, music and theatre critic.

Life 

Born in Vienna, Walden studied several semesters German studies. Since the 1950s, he was cultural editor of the Viennese Arbeiter-Zeitung. He actively participated in cultural events, and in 1964 he was a founding member of the Vereins der Wiener Filmfestwochen, which took over the organization of the Vienna Film Festival Viennale, as it was now called, alongside Edwin Zbonek. He taught film analysis at the Vienna Film Academy in the 1970s and 80s, was asked to serve as a juror at international film festivals such as the Berlinale and in the 1980s was a member of the jury of the Film Advisory Board of the Austrian Film Fund of the Federal Ministry of Education, Science and Research He was also a patron and mentor of young Viennese filmmakers, whom he sometimes supported materially. Through the first font insert in the opening credits of the film  dedicated his film Notausgang to him out of gratitude.

Walden belonged to a generation of critics who made no secret of their passion for films, Theaterstücke oder Opern which were and are often reviewed in other media by colleagues from other countries. or in diplomacy thesis.

Walden also appeared in films and wrote poetry for contemporary music.

Walden died in Vienna at the age of 78.

Publications 
 As fiction critic
 Als wäre es nie gewesen. Anatomie eines Verrates. Roman. Hans Deutsch Verlag, Vienna 1962.
 Sindelar. Der "papierene" Heerführer. Eine Erzählung. Verlag der Zeitschrift Der jugendliche Arbeiter, Vienna 1949.

 Other publications
 Der tschechoslowakische Film. ed.: Socialist Students of Austria, Vienna 1966 (with Antonín J. Liehm, Jean de Baroncelli.
 Österreichs Film: Eine Chronik der verlorenen Jahre. In Jacques Hannak (ed.): Bestandaufnahme Österreich. 1945–1963. Forum-Verlag, Vienna 1963,  (Fachaufsatz).
 Der Kopf des Monats. Ein armer Mann wie . Vienna 1949 (biography).
 Ich gab Euch Zeit! Kleine Lebensgeschichte des großen Sozialreformers Ferdinand Hanusch. Österreichischer Gewerkschaftsbund, Vienna 1948 (Jugendschriftenreihe, issue 4; Biography).

Further reading 
 As publicist
 Friedrich Stadler: Vertriebene Vernunft. Emigration und Exil österreichischer Wissenschaft. 1930–1940. Vol. 2: Emigration – Exil – Kontinuität. Unveränderte Neuauflage. Lit Verlag, Münster 2004, .
 Hans Heinz Fabris,  (ed.): Die vierte Macht. Zu Geschichte und Kultur des Journalismus in Österreich seit 1945. Verlag für Gesellschaftskritik, Wien 1991,  (Österreichische Texte zur Gesellschaftskritik, vol.53).
  (ed.): Bestandaufnahme Österreich. 1945–1963. Forum-Verlag, Vienna 1963, .

 As film critic and film patron
 Edith Blaschitz: Populärer Film und der „Kampf gegen Schmutz und Schund“. Filmrezeption in Österreich zwischen Kontrolle, Identitätsfindung und Bildungsbemühen (1946–1970). Dissertation, Universität Wien, Wien 2009 (online, PDF-Datei, 3,46 MB).
 Rita Hochwimmer: Tendenzen und Brüche in der Entwicklung des Filmfestivals Viennale von 1960–1972 und ihre öffentliche Rezeption. Dissertation, Universität Wien, Vienna 2008 (online, PDF-Datei, 1,71 MB).
 : Im Kino erlebe ich die Welt. 100 Jahre Kino und Film in Österreich. Christian Brandstätter Verlag, Vienna 1997, .
Wespennest, Vienna 1995,  (series Wespennest-Film).
 Walter Fritz: Kino in Österreich. Vol.3: 1945–1983. Film zwischen Kommerz und Avantgarde. Österreichischer Bundesverlag, Vienna 1984,  (Ein Österreich-Thema aus dem Bundes-Verlag).

 As literary and theatre critic 
 Sabine Krangler: Helmut Qualtinger or: die Demaskierung einer Volksseele. Eine Abhandlung des Werks "Herr Karl" zum politischen und gesellschaftlichen Zeitgeschehen und dessen Medienecho. Thesis, Universität Wien, Vienna 2006 (online, PDF, 556 kB)
 Nicole Metzger: "Alles in Szene setzen, nur sich selber nicht." Der Regisseur Leopold Lindtberg. Braumüller, 2002,  (Blickpunkte, Sonderband der Schriften der Schweizerischen Gesellschaft für Theaterkultur, vol.23; zugleich Dissertation, Universität Wien 2001).
 : Vom Boykott zur Anerkennung. Brecht und Österreich. 2nd revised edition. Löcker Verlag, Vienna 1984, ; .
 : Mechanismen der Literaturrezeption in Österreich am Beispiel Ödön von Horváths. Verlag Hans-Dieter Heinz, Stuttgart 1978,  (Stuttgarter Arbeiten zur Germanistik, vol.46; dissertation, University of Innsbruck 1977).

 As music critic
 Thomas Eickhoff: Politische Dimensionen einer Komponisten-Biographie im 20. Jahrhundert. Gottfried von Einem. Franz Steiner Verlag, Stuttgart 1991,  (zugleich Dissertation, Bergische Universität Wuppertal 1996).
 Desiree Schuschitz: 1900-1980. 80 Jahre Wiener Symphoniker. Ein Stück Wiener Musikgeschichte. Musikverlag Doblinger, Vienna 1980, .
 Manfred Wagner: Geschichte der österreichischen Musikkritik in Beispielen. Schneider, 1979, pp. 25, 646 ff. (Publication of the Instituts für Österreichische Musikdokumentation, vol. 5).

References

External links 
 

1914 births
1992 deaths
Austrian film critics
Austrian literary critics
Austrian music critics
Austrian theatre critics
Pseudonyms
Writers from Vienna